The 1874 Canadian federal election was held on January 22, 1874, to elect members of the House of Commons of Canada of the 3rd Parliament of Canada. Sir John A. Macdonald, who had recently been forced out of office as prime minister, and his Conservatives were defeated by the Liberal Party under their new leader Prime Minister Alexander Mackenzie.

Macdonald's government had been forced to resign on November 5, 1873, because of allegations of corruption relating to the construction of the Canadian Pacific Railway (see the Pacific Scandal).  The Liberals under Mackenzie formed a government two days later with an election called for January. The Tories were unable to recover from the scandal and lost the election as a result.

The election was the first general election after Prince Edward Island's entry into Confederation, and the first to use secret ballots in Canada.

National results

Notes:

1 Liberal-Conservatives sat with the Conservative caucus in the House of Commons.

Acclamations

The following Members of Parliament were elected by acclamation;
 Ontario: 1 Liberal-Conservative, 13 Liberals
 Quebec: 10 Conservatives, 4 Liberal-Conservatives, 15 Liberals
 New Brunswick: 1 Conservative, 3 Liberals, 1 Independent Liberal
 Nova Scotia: 5 Liberals
 Prince Edward Island: 2 Liberals

Results by province

See also
 

List of Canadian federal general elections

References 

1874
 Federal
January 1874 events